Siders Bluff is a bold rock bluff that forms the northwest end of Tobin Mesa in the Mesa Range, Victoria Land. The bluff exposes an easily accessible section of Jurassic basalt. The feature was studied by Ohio State University geological parties in 1981-82 and 1982–83. Named by Advisory Committee on Antarctic Names (US-ACAN) after Mary A. Siders, geologist in those field parties.

Cliffs of Victoria Land
Pennell Coast